This page provides the party lists for New Zealand's 2011 general election. Party lists determine (in the light of country-wide proportional voting) the appointment of list MPs under the mixed-member proportional (MMP) representation electoral system. The Electoral Commission issued a deadline of noon on 1 November for submitting party lists.

Successful parties 
Parties are ordered according to their share of the vote.

National Party 
The National Party released a party list of 75 candidates in early September. The list was revised when Allan Peachey, ranked 48th, withdrew due to ill health. Simon O'Connor, who replaced Peachey as candidate for the Tāmaki electorate, was then added to the list, albeit in a lower position than Peachey had held.

Labour Party 
The Labour Party announced a party list of 70 candidates.

Four sitting MPs were not placed on the list. Damien O'Connor, a list MP contesting West Coast-Tasman, and Lianne Dalziel, MP for Christchurch East, both declined a place on the list stating they only wanted to represent the electorate they held candidacy for. Louisa Wall, who had twice entered Parliament as a list MP following another list member's resignation, also stood as an electorate-only candidate in Manurewa. Manukau East MP Ross Robertson has never accepted a list position.

Green Party 
The Green Party, after announcing a preliminary list in April, announced a list of thirty people in late May. In accordance with party rules, the remainder of the candidate pool was then ranked in alphabetical order, with the final list submitted to the Electoral Commission having sixty-one people.

New Zealand First
New Zealand First released a party list of thirty-three people on 1 November.

Māori Party
The Māori Party released a party list of 17 candidates on 29 October.

Mana Party
The Mana Party announced a party list of twenty people on 1 November.

ACT New Zealand 
ACT New Zealand released its party list on 28 August. A modified list was announced in October, reflecting the withdrawal of parliamentary leader John Boscawen (who was initially ranked second) and the confirmation of Catherine Isaac (whose name had not been officially released due to uncertainty about her availability). The full list eventually submitted to the Electoral Commission had fifty-five people on it, with those not previously ranked (with the exception of the very last) being ranked alphabetically.

United Future
United Future released a party list of fifteen people on 20 October.

Unsuccessful parties

Conservative Party
The Conservative Party released a party list of thirty people on 1 November.

Aotearoa Legalise Cannabis Party 
The Aotearoa Legalise Cannabis Party released a party list of 28 candidates on 29 October.

Democrats for Social Credit 
The Democratic Party for Social Credit released a party list of twenty-four people on 21 October.

Libertarianz
Libertarianz has announced a party list of twenty-seven people.

Alliance
The Alliance party list consists of fourteen people.

References 

2011 New Zealand general election
Lists of New Zealand political candidates
Party lists